Abhaya is an Odia action thriller film produced by Tarang Cine Productions. Anubhav Mohanty, Elina Samantray and Manoj Mishra are in the lead roles. Though this movie is a remake of 2013 Tamil movie Ivan Veramathiri, the key sequences of the screenplay (not found in the original version) were based on the Kannada movie Chakravyuha.

Cast
 Anubhav Mohanty as Abhaya
 Elina Samantray as Anu 
 Mihir Das
 Manoj Mishra
 Ashrumochan Mohanty
 Anita Das
 Pratibha Panda
 Saroj Das
 Sankarsan Pradhan

Music
The music for Abhaya is composed by Prem Anand while the lyrics are penned by Basant Raj Samal and Subrat Swain.

References

External links
 

2017 films
2010s Odia-language films
Odia remakes of Tamil films
2017 action thriller films
2017 masala films
Indian films about revenge
Indian action thriller films
Odia remakes of Kannada films